Skywest may refer to:

SkyWest Airlines, an airline serving the United States, Canada and Mexico
SkyWest, Inc., the parent company of SkyWest Airlines
Skywest Airlines, now operating as Virgin Australia Regional Airlines